Hanover Chapel was a church in Regent Street, London. It was built in 1825, and was demolished in 1896.

History
The building was situated in Regent Street between Hanover Street and Prince's Street. It was designed by Charles Robert Cockerell; the first stone was laid on 6 June 1823, and it was completed in 1825.

William Carnaby was organist from its opening until his death in 1839; in that year Charles Lucas was appointed organist. The incumbent was for many years the Reverend Joseph George Brett (father of William Brett, 1st Viscount Esher).

Edward Walford wrote in 1878: "... it is of the Ionic order, and in its internal arrangement somewhat resembles St Stephen's Church, Walbrook. The altar is enriched with carved work, and the fabric generally forms a fine architectural display, though utterly unsuited to a church."

There is a plaque attached to the building on the left of the original entrance door, informing that Hanover Chapel formerly stood on the site. Regent House now contains the London Apple Store.

References

External links
 "Hanover Chapel, Regent Street, London: elevation, section and plan" at Royal Institute of British Architects

Former buildings and structures in the City of Westminster
Buildings and structures demolished in 1896
Former Church of England church buildings